King Lear is a 1910 Italian silent historical drama film directed by Gerolamo Lo Savio and starring Ermete Novelli, Francesca Bertini and Olga Giannini Novelli. It is an adaptation of William Shakespeare's King Lear.

Cast
 Ermete Novelli as King Lear  
 Francesca Bertini as Cordelia  
 Olga Giannini Novelli as King Lear's Daughter  
 Giannina Chiantoni as King Lear's Daughter

References

Bibliography 
 Moliterno, Gino. The A to Z of Italian Cinema. Scarecrow Press, 2009.

External links 
 

1910 films
1910s historical drama films
Italian historical drama films
1910s Italian-language films
Italian silent short films
Films based on King Lear
Films directed by Gerolamo Lo Savio
Films set in England
Italian black-and-white films
1910 drama films
Silent historical drama films